John Cole was an American bobsledder who competed in the late 1950s. He won a bronze medal in the four-man event at the 1957 FIBT World Championships in St. Moritz.

He was born in Utica, December 28, 1929, the son of the late Edward and Neva Trossetti Cole.  John was an Army Veteran of the Korean War.  For many years, he operated Cole's Hardware in Utica, New York and later was self-employed painting contractor.  John was a member of St. Peter's Church, the William E. Burke Knights of Columbus Council #189 and past President of the Guys and Gals Single's Club.  In 1957 John won a Bronze Medal with the U.S. Bob Sled team in the World Championships in St. Moritz, Switzerland.

John passed on March 4, 1993.  John is survived by a daughter and son-in-law, Kathleen and Robert Bushey, Deerfield NY; three sons and one daughter-in-law, David and Janet Cole; Utica, NY, Bradley Cole, Ellensburg, WA; James Cole, Utica NY; five grandchildren Andrew and Cassandra Bushey; Michael, Karen and John Cole.

References 

 Bobsleigh four-man world championship medalists since 1930

American male bobsledders
1929 births
1993 deaths